Oedaspis trotteriana is a species of tephritid or fruit flies in the genus Oedaspis of the family Tephritidae.

Distribution
Morocco, Algeria, Libya, Egypt, Israel.

References

Tephritinae
Insects described in 1913
Taxa named by Mario Bezzi
Diptera of Africa